This page documents the tornadoes and tornado outbreaks of 1964, primarily in the United States. Most tornadoes form in the U.S., although some events may take place internationally. Tornado statistics for older years like this often appear significantly lower than modern years due to fewer reports or confirmed tornadoes.

Events

United States yearly total

January
There were 14 tornadoes confirmed in the US in January.

January 21
A rare F0 tornado touched down in California.

January 24

An outbreak of nine tornadoes struck Arkansas, Kentucky, and Alabama, killing 10 and injuring 10. The strongest of these tornadoes, which was rated F4, swept multiple houses off of their foundations south of Harpersville, Alabama. This tornado was responsible for the 10 deaths that occurred during this outbreak.

February
There were 2 tornadoes confirmed in the US in February.

March
There were 36 tornadoes confirmed in the US in March.

March 4

A destructive outbreak of eight tornadoes pummeled the Mississippi and Tennessee Valleys, killing four and injuring 44.

March 8–10

An outbreak of nine tornadoes struck the Mississippi and Ohio Valleys, Southeast, and Northeast, killing two and injuring eight.

March 25–26

Just 17 days after the previous one, another outbreak of eight tornadoes hit the same general area, injuring 36.

April
157 tornadoes were confirmed in the U.S. in April.

April 2–8

A tornado outbreak sequence spawned 33 tornadoes from the Great Plains to the Southeastern United States. The strongest and worst event was an F5 tornado that moved through Wichita Falls, Texas. It was the first tornado to ever be captured on live television. Seven people were killed and 111 others were injured. Overall, the outbreak killed seven people and injured 119. It would be the first of two violent tornadoes to hit Wichita Falls, with the other—an F4 tornado that killed 42—occurring on April 10, 1979.

April 12–14

Another large outbreak of 23 tornadoes struck the Midwest and Ozarks, killing seven and injuring 75.

April 17
A squall line moving through Harris County, Texas spawned a tornado that killed one person and injured two more when a trailer home was blown over near Aldine. The squall line also generated high winds that damaged several hundred homes and buildings and knocking down trees and power poles in the northern and eastern parts of the county. Winds of 92 mph were measured at the Shell Oil refinery in Deer Park. The 81-foot wide tornado was on the ground for 22 miles and lifted near Deer Park. The tornado was rated as an F2, although Grazulis classified it as F1.

May
134 tornadoes were confirmed in the U.S. in May.

May 4–8

A massive tornado outbreak sequence spawned 73 tornadoes from Texas to Michigan. On May 5, the second F5 tornado of the year carved a 79.7 mile path through Adams, Clay, Hamilton, York, Polk, and Antelope Counties in Nebraska, killing four people and injuring 50 others. On May 8, An F4 tornado struck suburban areas of metropolitan Detroit in Macomb County, Michigan, before continuing into Lambton County in Ontario, killing 11 people and injuring 224 others. In all, along with the 15 fatalities, 383 others were injured.

May 29–30

An F3 tornado killed one and injured eight in New Mexico, the first tornado to officially cause fatalities in the state. Nine other weak tornadoes also touched down in Wyoming, Texas, and Wisconsin with no casualties.

June
There were 137 tornadoes confirmed in the US in June.

June 15

An outbreak of 10 tornadoes of hit the Midwest, Ohio Valley, and Northeast, injuring 18.

June 17–23

A large outbreak sequence of 52 tornadoes struck the Great Plains, Midwest, Ohio Valley, and Southeast, injuring 37.

July
There were 63 tornadoes confirmed in the US in July.

August
There were 79 tornadoes confirmed in the US in August.

August 18
A rare F0 tornado touched down in Washington.

August 22

A violent outbreak of 14 tornadoes hit the Great Lakes region, injuring 38.

August 24–31 (Elsewhere)

As Hurricane Cleo approached and hit the Southeast, 26 other tornadoes touched down in an unrelated outbreak sequence that struck the Great Plains, Southwest, and Midwest. On August 27, an F2 tornado struck the San Xavier Mission Village, Arizona west of Tucson in Pima County, destroying four homes, killing two people, and injuring nine others. This was the first official killer tornado ever recorded in Arizona, as well as the deadliest in ever recorded the state. On August 29, a localized, but destructive outbreak of six tornadoes hit Iowa and North Dakota with a 100 yard wide F4 tornado injuring two as it traveled 15.8 miles through Kossuth County, Iowa. Overall, the outbreak sequence killed two and injured 12.

August 27–31 (Hurricane Cleo)

Hurricane Cleo fueled an outbreak of 12 tornadoes as it moved through the Southeast United States. The strongest tornado was a 50 yard wide F3 tornado that tore a 21.9 mile path through Scotland and Richmond County, North Carolina, injuring 15. A total of 21 people were injured from the tornadoes.

September
There were 25 tornadoes confirmed in the US in September.

September 3

A small, but damaging outbreak of five tornadoes impacted Iowa, Wisconsin, and Michigan with a large, 800 yard wide F3 tornado injuring four in Richland County, Wisconsin.

September 12–13 (Hurricane Dora)

Hurricane Dora spawned three weak tornadoes in the Carolinas as it moved through the Southeast.

October
There were 22 tornadoes confirmed in the U.S. in October.

October 3–4 (Hurricane Hilda)

A deadly and damaging outbreak of 12 tornadoes struck Louisiana, Mississippi, Alabama, and North Carolina due to the passage of Hurricane Hilda. In Louisiana, at least six tornadoes and two waterspouts were reported. A violent F4 tornado near Larose killed 22 people, injured 165 others, and destroyed 35 homes, despite being on the ground for only . Automobiles in the path of the twister were also damaged. It is only one of two violent tornadoes ever spawned by a hurricane with the other coming in 1961. No other tornado in the state resulted in deaths, though multiple twisters in the New Orleans metropolitan area caused extensive damage to several automobiles and buildings, knocked down power lines, which created localized power, and injured five people. In Mississippi, an F2 tornado struck areas in Pearl River County, destroying a home, two barns, and a pumping station. In Alabama, at least three tornadoes occurred across six counties, with one injuring two people after damaging five homes, a hospital, and a plant. Several more tornadoes were reported in six counties of North Carolina, with two F2 tornadoes being confirmed. In all, 22 people were killed and 172 others were injured.

October 14 (Hurricane Isbell)

An outbreak of nine tornadoes occurred as Hurricane Isbell moved from southwest to northeast across South Florida. 48 people were injured.

November
There were 17 tornadoes confirmed in the US in November.

November 1
A rare F1 tornado touched down in California.

December
There were 18 tornadoes confirmed in the US in December.

December 24–26

A tragic outbreak of 14 tornadoes struck the Southeast during the Christmas holiday, killing two and injuring 28.

See also
 Tornado
 Tornadoes by year
 Tornado records
 Tornado climatology
 Tornado myths
 List of tornado outbreaks
 List of F5 and EF5 tornadoes
 List of North American tornadoes and tornado outbreaks
 List of 21st-century Canadian tornadoes and tornado outbreaks
 List of European tornadoes and tornado outbreaks
 List of tornadoes and tornado outbreaks in Asia
 List of Southern Hemisphere tornadoes and tornado outbreaks
 List of tornadoes striking downtown areas
 List of tornadoes with confirmed satellite tornadoes
 Tornado intensity
 Fujita scale
 Enhanced Fujita scale

References

 
1964 meteorology
Tornado-related lists by year
Torn